Ruben Pacheco may refer to:

 Ruben Pacheco (Costa Rica), Costa Rican minister of tourism since 2006
 Rubén Pacheco (Venezuela), current Venezuelan ambassador to Angola